Cage of Gold is a 1950 British drama film directed by Basil Dearden, and starring Jean Simmons, David Farrar, and James Donald.

Plot
A young woman, Judith Moray, deserts her prospective fiancé, the nice doctor Alan Kearn, for an old flame - the dashing, but roguish, former wing commander Bill Glennan. Glennan gets her pregnant and marries her, but leaves her on the morning after the wedding when he learns that her father cannot offer him financial support. Two years later, she - having been told that Glennan is dead - has married Kearn and they keep Glennan's son. But then, Glennan suddenly re-appears, and begins to blackmail her.

Main cast

 Jean Simmons as Judith Moray
 David Farrar as Bill Glennan
 James Donald as Dr Alan Kearn
 Herbert Lom as Rahman
 Madeleine Lebeau as Marie Jouvet
 Maria Mauban as Antoinette Duport
 Bernard Lee as Inspector Grey
 Grégoire Aslan as Duport
 Gladys Henson as Waddy
 Harcourt Williams as Dr Kearn senior
 Léo Ferré as Victor
 George Benson as Assistant Registrar
 Martin Boddey as Police Sergeant Adams
 Arthur Hambling as Jenkins
 Campbell Singer as Constable
 Sam Kydd as Waiter

Production
Michael Relph was forced to do the movie at short notice at the request of Ealing.

Reception
Cage of Gold premiered on 21 September 1950 at Odeon Marble Arch in London, replacing the Burt Lancaster comedy Mister 880. The reviewer for The Times wasn't overly impressed, writing: "Ealing Studios normally know what they are about, and, in an admirably objective programme note, they frankly admit that Cage of Gold breaks completely away from what they call their 'semi-documentary' style, and is 'emotional melodrama'. The description can be accepted. ... It all runs efficiently to its rules and time-table, and, oddly enough, Miss Simmons acts better here than in So Long at the Fair."

A critic in the British film magazine Picture Show, wrote that the film is "lavishly staged and efficiently directed, but the characters are somewhat stereotyped".

After the US première on 18 January 1952, The New York Times reviewer wrote: "Cage of Gold ... is a polished, often suspenseful British version of the familiar old Enoch Arden yarn. The fact that it doesn't come off on the whole is not only disappointing, but downright annoying. For even with some serious shortcomings, here is a quality product, as might be expected from Michael Balcon, who has produced more than his share of top-notch imports. This one has, at least, all the top-notch trimmings. The photography is excellent, Basil Dearden's direction is slick as a whistle, and the acting of the cast, headed by Jean Simmons and David Farrar, is almost consistently good. ... Sadly, though, the picture as a whole is a letdown".

References

External links
 
 

Films directed by Basil Dearden
Films produced by Michael Balcon
1950 films
1950 drama films
British drama films
Ealing Studios films
Films set in London
Films scored by Georges Auric
Films set in France
Films with screenplays by Jack Whittingham
British black-and-white films
1950s English-language films
1950s British films